Carancho is a 2010 crime film directed by Pablo Trapero and starring Ricardo Darín and Martina Gusmán. A co-production between Argentina, Chile, Spain, France and South Korea, the film was entered into the Un Certain Regard section of the 2010 Cannes Film Festival. The film was selected as the Argentine entry for the Best Foreign Language Film at the 83rd Academy Awards, but it did not make the final shortlist.

Plot
Sosa is a lawyer recently expelled from the bar association who works as an ambulance chaser - known as "carancho" in Argentina - touring the emergency departments of the public hospitals and the police stations, in search of potential clients for his barely-legal law firm. One night he meets Luján, a young doctor recently arrived from the provinces trying to get an internship as a surgeon. The two start a romantic relationship that is threatened when Sosa breaks his association with his corrupt boss. When Sosa is about to get back his attorney registration (and while making amends for his bad deeds) he and Luján are attacked by former partners of the firm, initiating an escalation of violence.

Cast
 Ricardo Darín as Héctor Sosa
 Martina Gusmán as Luján Olivera
 Carlos Weber as El Perro
 José Luis Arias as Casal
 Fabio Ronzano as Pico
 Loren Acuña as Mariana
 Gabriel Almirón as Muñoz
 José Manuel Espeche as Garrido

Reception
On the review aggregator website Rotten Tomatoes, the film holds an approval rating of 88% based on 46 reviews, and an average rating of 6.8/10. On Metacritic, the film has a weighted average score of 66 out of 100, based on 15 critics, indicating "generally favorable reviews".

See also
 List of submissions to the 83rd Academy Awards for Best Foreign Language Film
 List of Argentine submissions for the Academy Award for Best Foreign Language Film

References

External links
 
 
 
 
 

2010 films
2010 crime films
2010s Spanish-language films
Films directed by Pablo Trapero
Films shot in Buenos Aires
Argentine crime films
Spanish crime films
French crime films
South Korean crime films
2010s Argentine films
2010s Spanish films
2010s French films
2010s South Korean films